Vladimir Tintor (born 1 September 1979) is a Serbian retired football midfielder and now he is working as a football coach in Serbia with UEFA Pro Licence.

Career
After playing in the youth tams of his hometown club FK Inđija, his talent was spotted by the giants Red Star Belgrade that insisted he moved to their youth team. In the next years he would play in a number of Serbian top league clubs, namely, FK Železnik, FK Budućnost Banatski Dvor, FK Vojvodina, Red Star Belgrade, FK Rad, FK Inđija, FK Napredak Kruševac, FK Čukarički, but also in Swedish Bodens BK, Kazakh FC Zhetysu and in Montenegrin FK Berane.

References

External links
 Profile at Srbijafudbal
 Profile and stats until 2003 at Dekisa.Tripod.com

1979 births
Living people
Serbian footballers
FK Železnik players
FK Budućnost Banatski Dvor players
FK Vojvodina players
FK Inđija players
FK Rad players
Red Star Belgrade footballers
Bodens BK players
Expatriate footballers in Sweden
FK Napredak Kruševac players
Serbian SuperLiga players
Expatriate footballers in Kazakhstan
FK Čukarički players
Association football midfielders
Serbian expatriate sportspeople in Kazakhstan
FK Berane players
Montenegrin First League players
FK Dinamo Vranje players
RFK Novi Sad 1921 players
People from Inđija